Clinical chemistry (also known as chemical pathology, clinical biochemistry or medical biochemistry) is the area of chemistry that is generally concerned with analysis of bodily fluids for diagnostic and therapeutic purposes. It is an applied form of biochemistry (not to be confused with medicinal chemistry, which involves basic research for drug development).

The discipline originated in the late 19th century with the use of simple chemical reaction tests for various components of blood and urine. In the many decades since, other techniques have been applied as science and technology have advanced, including the use and measurement of enzyme activities, spectrophotometry, electrophoresis, and immunoassay. There are now many blood tests and clinical urine tests with extensive diagnostic capabilities.

Most current laboratories are now highly automated to accommodate the high workload typical of a hospital laboratory. Tests performed are closely monitored and quality controlled.

All biochemical tests come under chemical pathology. These are performed on any kind of body fluid, but mostly on serum or plasma.  Serum is the yellow watery part of blood that is left after blood has been allowed to clot and all blood cells have been removed. This is most easily done by centrifugation, which packs the denser blood cells and platelets to the bottom of the centrifuge tube, leaving the liquid serum fraction resting above the packed cells. This initial step before analysis has recently been included in instruments that operate on the "integrated system" principle. Plasma is in essence the same as serum, but is obtained by centrifuging the blood without clotting. Plasma is obtained by centrifugation before clotting occurs. The type of test required dictates what type of sample is used.

A large medical laboratory will accept samples for up to about 700 different kinds of tests. Even the largest of laboratories rarely do all these tests themselves, and some must be referred to other labs.

This large array of tests can be categorised into sub-specialities of:

General or routine chemistry – commonly ordered blood chemistries (e.g., liver and kidney function tests).
Special chemistry - elaborate techniques such as electrophoresis, and manual testing methods.
Clinical endocrinology – the study of hormones, and diagnosis of endocrine disorders.
Toxicology – the study of drugs of abuse and other chemicals.
Therapeutic Drug Monitoring – measurement of therapeutic medication levels to optimize dosage.
Urinalysis – chemical analysis of urine for a wide array of diseases, along with other fluids such as CSF and effusions
Fecal analysis – mostly for detection of gastrointestinal disorders.

Tests 
Common clinical chemistry tests include:

Electrolytes
Sodium
Potassium
Chloride
Bicarbonate

Renal (kidney) function tests
Creatinine
Blood urea nitrogen

Liver function tests
Total protein (serum)
Albumin
Globulins
A/G ratio (albumin-globulin)
Protein electrophoresis
Urine protein
Bilirubin; direct; indirect; total
Aspartate transaminase (AST)
Alanine transaminase (ALT)
Gamma-glutamyl transpeptidase (GGT)
Alkaline phosphatase (ALP)

Cardiac markers
H-FABP
Troponin
Myoglobin
CK-MB
B-type natriuretic peptide (BNP)

Minerals
Calcium
Magnesium
Phosphate
Potassium

Blood disorders
Iron
Transferrin
TIBC
Vitamin B12
Vitamin D
Folic acid

Miscellaneous
Glucose
C-reactive protein
Glycated hemoglobin (HbA1c)
Uric acid
Arterial blood gases ([H+], PCO2, PO2)
Adrenocorticotropic hormone (ACTH)
Toxicological screening and forensic toxicology (drugs and toxins)
Neuron-specific enolase (NSE)
fecal occult blood test (FOBT)

Panel tests
A set of commonly ordered tests are combined into a panel:
Basic metabolic panel (BMP) - 8 tests - sodium, potassium, chloride, bicarbonate, blood urea nitrogen (BUN), creatinine, glucose, calcium
Comprehensive metabolic panel (CMP) - 14 tests - above BMP plus total protein, albumin, alkaline phosphatase (ALP), alanine amino transferase (ALT), aspartate amino transferase (AST), bilirubin

See also
 Reference ranges for common blood tests
 Medical technologist
 Clinical Biochemistry (journal)

Notes and references

Bibliography

External links 
 American Association of Clinical Chemistry
 Association for Mass Spectrometry: Applications to the Clinical Lab (MSACL)

Clinical pathology
Pathology